Dalfsen is a municipality and a town in the Salland region of the Dutch province of Overijssel. The municipality of Dalfsen was increased to its current size on 1 January 2001 through the amalgamation of the municipalities of Nieuwleusen and Dalfsen. A variety of sallands is spoken here by segment of the population.

History
The name first appears in documents in 1231. Due to the closeness of Kasteel Rechteren, Dalfsen is one of several towns along the Overijssel section of the Vecht river never to have received city rights.

Population centres

Topography

Dutch Topographic map of the municipality of Dalfsen, June 2015.

Transportation
Dalfsen railway station
Dalfsen train crash

Notable people 

 Willem Lodewijk de Vos van Steenwijk (1859 in Dalfsen – 1947) a conservative Dutch politician
 Peter Nijkamp (born 1946 in Dalfsen) a Dutch economist and academic
 Ilse Warringa (born 1975 in Dalfsen) a Dutch Voice actress and actress

Sport 
 René Eijkelkamp (born 1964 in Dalfsen) a Dutch former footballer with 469 club caps and current coach
 Erben Wennemars (born 1975 in Dalfsen) a Dutch former speed skater
 Manon Nummerdor-Flier (born 1984 in Nieuwleusen) a retired volleyball player
 Korie Homan (born 1986 in de Wijk) a Dutch former wheelchair tennis player, gold medallist at the 2008 Paralympics
 Maikel Kieftenbeld (born 1990 in Lemelerveld) a Dutch professional footballer with over 300 club caps

Photos

References

External links

Official website

 
Municipalities of Overijssel
Populated places in Overijssel
Salland